is a Japanese violinist, arranger, and composer.

She directed the music for the 2006 Studio Ghibli animation short film Mizugumo Monmon.

Albums
 Golden Aurora (2004)
 Crystal Rose Garden (2005)
 Mizugumo Monmon Original Soundtrack (2006)

External links 
 

Studio Ghibli people
Japanese musicians
Living people
Year of birth missing (living people)